Boneh-ye Qeysar (also Romanized as Boneh-ye Qeyşar and Boneh Qeysar; also known as Boneh Gheisar and Qeyşarābād) is a village in Mahur Berenji Rural District, Sardasht District, Dezful County, Khuzestan Province, Iran. At the 2006 census, its population was 131, in 18 families.

References 

Populated places in Dezful County